Brahmarshi Viswamitra  is a 1991 Indian Telugu-language Hindu mythological film based on the life of the sage Visvamitra, which is written, directed and produced by N. T. Rama Rao. It stars him in his comeback film after a 7-year hiatus from acting after leaving for politics completely- along with Nandamuri Balakrishna, and Meenakshi Seshadri, with music composed by Ravindra Jain. This film marked the debut of Jr.NTR as a child artist.

Plot 
The film begins with King Kaushika while hunting visiting Vasishta Maharshi's ashram where he notices a divine cow called Kamadhenuvu which can produce anything one wishes. Kaushika requests Vasishta to surrender it to him because the country will be prosperous if it is in the hands of a king. But Vasishta refuses when Kaushika tries to grab it forcibly it disappears. Kaushika feels it as an insult and realizes penance has more power than physical strength. So, he renounced his kingdom, becomes a saint performs a huge penance, and achieves the Brahmarshi title by facing many challenges from that day he is called Viswamitra. After that, King Trisanku belongs to Suryavamsam wishes to reach heaven with his mortal body and requests his Guru Vasishta to perform the needful rites to achieve the goal. But Vasishta refuses when Trishanku revolts on him and he curses him to form as horrific. Immediately, Trishanku reaches Viswamitra, he sends him to heaven where Lord Indra tosses him. Viswamitra stops him in between and creates a newly modernized heaven, especially for him. In this process, Viswamitra uses his entire penance power. Therefore, he starts his prayers and attains his power back. Once in the court of Indra, Viswamitra had a confrontation with Vasishta that a man with an aim and determination is more powerful than the deities. Viswamitra challenges that he will prove it and selects Harishchandra, ruler of Ayodhya.

There onwards, he starts testing Harishchandra, in the beginning, he asks a huge amount, and without any hesitation, Harishchandra agrees. Then he creates two beautiful girls called Matanga Kanyalu, tries to lure him, and also threatens either to marry the girls or leave the kingdom. So, he gives away his kingdom when Viswamitra asks to repay his amount. Harishchandra asks him for some time, he gives a month and accompanies his assistant Nakshatraka. Thereafter, Harishchandra reaches Kaasi where he observes that people are sold in the market. Due to the shortage of time, on his wife Chandramathi's advice, he sells her along with his son Lohitha. Next Nakshatraka asks to pay his travel expenses for which he sells himself to Veerabahu, king of the graveyard. Now Harishchandra works as a watchman at the burial ground. One day, unfortunately, Lohitha dies due to snakebite while Chandramathi is performing his funeral, Harishchandra stops her and asks her to pay the fee without knowing her identity. But she doesn't have anything when he indicates her golden wedding chain and she recognizes him as her husband because her wedding chain is invisible to others. In such pathetic situations also Harishchandra does not yield. Chandramathi rushes to get the money. At the same time, Viswamitra creates an illusion that Chadramathi has kidnapped and killed Kaasiraju's son. The King gives her the death sentence and sends her to Harishchandra to execute it. Even then he does not leave his true path and executes the punishment. Suddenly, Viswamitra appears, says that all this happened to spread the will-power of a man to the universe, and acknowledges him with his penance power.

Eras roll by, once Viswamitra intents to perform a Yaga for which two demons Marichasubhahulu are creating obstructions. So, he moves to Ayodhya and asks Dasaratha to send Rama Lakshmana for the protection of his Yaga. At that point, Viswamitra endorses the powerful weapons to Rama Lakshmana by which they destroy Tataki and Marichasubhahulu and complete the Yaga. Parallelly, Janaka announces Swayamvara to Seeta, and Viswamitra reaches Mithila with Rama Lakshmana. The main challenging task of Swayamvara is to ace the world-renowned bow of Siva. Ravana also arrives without an invitation but fails. Rama with the blessing of Viswamitra lifts the bow, breaks it, and marries Seeta. Viswamitra blesses the newly wedded couple and leaves to continue his penance. After many thousands of years, Indra attempts to foil his prayers, so, he sends an Apsara Menaka. Both of them get married and are blessed with a baby girl. But the couple leaves a newborn baby in the forest, Kanva Maharshi raises her by the name Shakuntala. Once King Dushyanta visits their Ashram, he loves and marries Shakuntala secretly. Before returning he gives his royal ring to her as a token of love. One day, Saint Durvasa visits Ashram but Shakuntala lost her thoughts on her husband and failed to greet him when he curses her that the person she is dreaming of will forget her. Afterward, Durvasa modifies his curse saying that the person will recollect his memory when he sees the personal token. Time passes, Shakuntala becomes pregnant and she is sent to her husband's house. On the way, the ring slips off her finger and is swallowed by a fish. Arriving at Hastinapuram, Dushyanta not able to recognize her, humiliated, Shakuntala returns to the forest and takes shelter at Kashyapa Mahamuni's Ashram, where she gives birth to a baby boy Bharata. Meanwhile, fishermen find the ring in the belly of a fish and take it to Dushyanta, when he recollects the past. Immediately, he set out to find Shakuntala, in the forest, he is surprised to see a young boy playing with wild animals and amazed by his boldness and strength. Bharata takes him to his mother Shakuntala. Here Viswamitra appears, reunites the couple, blesses Bharata to be the greatest ruler of India, and also entrusts him his entire penance power. At last, Viswamitra's penance power reaches to heights of the Himalayas where he utilizes it for the welfare of the universe by preaching great Gayatri Mantra. Finally, the movie ends with Viswamitra becoming one among the stars of the universe at Saptarishi Mandalam

Cast 

N. T. Rama Rao as Visvaamitra & Ravana (dual role)
Nandamuri Balakrishna as Satya Harischandra & Dushyanta (dual role)
Meenakshi Seshadri as Menaka
Deepika Chikhalia as Chandramathi
Madhumita as Shakuntala
Amjhad Khan as Veerabahu
Gummadi as Vashista
Suthi Velu as Nakshatraka
Ashok Kumar as Indhra
KK Sarma as Kalakoushukudu
Jaya Bhaskar as Trisanku
Aruna Irani as Kalakoushukudu's wife
Kanaka as Seetha
Tara as Shakuntala's friend
Gayatri as Shakuntala's friend
Disco Shanti as Matanga Kanya
Kuali as Matanga Kanya
Master Amith as Lohitha
N. T. Rama Rao Jr. as Bharata (child role)
Mikkilineni as Janaka

Production 
Brahmarshi Viswamitra marks the first screen appearance of N. T. Rama Rao Jr., who played Bharata.

Soundtrack 

Music composed by Ravindra Jain. Lyrics written by C. Narayana Reddy. Music released on Lahari Music Company.

References

External links 

1990s Telugu-language films
1991 films
Films based on the Mahabharata
Films based on the Ramayana
Films directed by N. T. Rama Rao
Films scored by Ravindra Jain
Hindu mythological films